Gornji Potočari is a village located in the municipality of Srebrenica, Republika Srpska, Bosnia and Herzegovina. As of 2013 census, it has a population of 263 inhabitants.

Demographics
As of 1991 census, it had a population of 896 inhabitants, all Bosniaks. As of 2013 census, the village has a population of 263 inhabitants, of whom 261 (98.8%) were Bosniaks and 2 others.

References

Populated places in Srebrenica
Srebrenica